Claidel Kohinor (born 7 February 1992) is a Surinamese footballer who plays as a goalkeeper for Surinamese club Robinhood and the Suriname national team.

Club career
Kohinor played for Leo Victor and Notch before moving to Robinhood. Kohinor was named as goalkeeper of the week after a game against AS Capoise in the 2019 CONCACAF League.

International career
In 2011, he was named in the Suriname team for the CONCACAF U-20 Championship. Being the second goalkeeper of Suriname senior team he got the chance to prove himself in international friendly matches against  Guyana and French Guiana in February 2016. Showing potential and being in good form he got the chance to play in the 2017 Caribbean Cup qualification. He started in the 1st match of round one against Guadeloupe a match that ended in a draw. Suriname lost in the penalty shootout, in this match he was one of the penalty takers in the shootout and ended up missing the shot. He didn't get to play the second match, but did get to play in both matches of the second round against  Saint Kitts and Nevis and Saint Vincent and the Grenadines.

In June 2021, Kohinor was named to the Suriname squad for the 2021 CONCACAF Gold Cup.

References

External links
 
 

1992 births
Living people
Surinamese footballers
Sportspeople from Paramaribo
Association football goalkeepers
S.V. Leo Victor players
S.V. Notch players
S.V. Robinhood players
SVB Eerste Divisie players
Suriname international footballers
Suriname under-20 international footballers
2021 CONCACAF Gold Cup players